Groce is a surname. Notable people with the surname include:

Cari Groce, American tennis player and coach
Clif Groce (born 1972), American football player
DeJuan Groce (born 1980), American football player
John Groce (born 1971), American college basketball coach
Larry Groce (born 1948), American singer-songwriter and radio host
Michael Groce, reformed English poet and community worker

See also
Groce (Kakanj) is a village in the municipality of Kakanj, Bosnia and Herzegovina.